Lefferts may refer to:

People
 Charles M. Lefferts (1873–1923), American illustrator and soldier
 Craig Lefferts (b. 1957), American professional baseball player
 George Lefferts, American writer, producer and director
 John Lefferts (1785–1829), American politician
 Winifred E. Lefferts (1903–1995), American painter, designer and philanthropist
 Joseph C. Lefferts (1993 - current), American Photographer, designer

Places
 Lefferts Island, Nunavut, Canada
 Lake Lefferts, Matawan, New Jersey

Other uses
 Lefferts Boulevard, formerly Lefferts Avenue, street in Queens, New York City
 Lefferts Historic House, Brooklyn, New York
 Ozone Park–Lefferts Boulevard (IND Fulton Street Line), elevated station at Lefferts Boulevard
 Prospect Lefferts Gardens, Brooklyn, neighborhood

See also
 Leffert (disambiguation)